Second Round is Taiwanese Mandopop rock band Mayday's eighth studio album. It was released on 16 December 2011.

Track listing
The following is the track list from the "No Where" (末日版) version of the album.

References

2011 albums
Mayday (Taiwanese band) albums